Erika von Thellmann (1902–1988) was an Austrian actress who appeared in more than a hundred films and television series during her career.

Selected filmography
 The Stone Rider (1923)
 Marriage Strike (1935)
The Green Domino (1935)
 The Valley of Love (1935)
 Susanne in the Bath (1936)
 The Irresistible Man (1937)
 The Deruga Case (1938)
 The Great and the Little Love (1938)
 Opera Ball (1939)
 Roses in Tyrol (1940)
 My Daughter Doesn't Do That (1940)
 Carl Peters (1941)
 Women Are Better Diplomats (1941)
 With the Eyes of a Woman (1942)
 Kohlhiesel's Daughters (1943)
 Young Hearts (1944)
 Tell the Truth (1946)
 Everything Will Be Better in the Morning (1948)
 In the Temple of Venus (1948)
 Twelve Hearts for Charly (1949)
 Royal Children (1950)
 Kissing Is No Sin (1950)
 One Night Apart (1950)
 Everything for the Company (1950)
 Wedding with Erika (1950)
 The Violin Maker of Mittenwald (1950)
 My Name is Niki (1952)
 A Very Big Child (1952)
 Toxi (1952)
 Fritz and Friederike (1952)
 Knall and Fall as Detectives (1952)
 The Exchange (1952)
 Scandal at the Girls' School (1953)
 Prosecutor Corda (1953)
 Such a Charade (1953)
 Ball of Nations (1954)
 The Spanish Fly (1955)
 Your Life Guards (1955)
 Her First Date (1955)
 The Double Husband (1955)
 Fruit Without Love (1956)
 The Girl Without Pyjamas (1957)
 The Count of Luxemburg (1957)
 The Good Soldier Schweik (1960)
 A Mission for Mr. Dodd (1964)
 Willi Manages The Whole Thing (1972)

References

Bibliography
 Fritsche, Maria. Homemade Men In Postwar Austrian Cinema: Nationhood, Genre and Masculinity . Berghahn Books, 2013.

External links

1902 births
1988 deaths
Austrian film actresses
Austrian television actresses